Mycobacteroides immunogenum (formerly Mycobacterium immunogenum) is a species of bacteria from the phylum Actinomycetota, belonging to the genus Mycobacteroides.

These non-tuberculous mycobacteria are sometimes found in fouling water-based cutting fluids, often causing hypersensitivity pneumonitis to the machinists in the affected grinding plants.

The complete genome sequence of Mycobacteroides immunogenum CCUG 47286T was deposited and published in DNA Data Bank of Japan, European Nucleotide Archive, and GenBank in 2016 under the accession number CP011530.

References

External links
Type strain of Mycobacteroides immunogenum at BacDive -  the Bacterial Diversity Metadatabase

Acid-fast bacilli
immunogenum
Bacteria described in 2001